Kentaro Yano (1 March 1912 in Tokyo, Japan – 25 December 1993) was a mathematician working on differential geometry who introduced the Bochner–Yano theorem.

He also published a classical book about geometric objects (i.e., sections of natural fiber bundles) and Lie derivatives of these objects.

Publications
 Les espaces à connexion projective et la géométrie projective des paths, Iasi, 1938
 Geometry of Structural Forms (Japanese), 1947
 Groups of Transformations in Generalized Spaces, Tokyo, Akademeia Press, 1949
 with Salomon Bochner: Curvature and Betti Numbers, Princeton University Press, Annals of Mathematical Studies, 1953
  2020 reprint
 Differential geometry on complex and almost complex spaces, Macmillan, New York 1965
 Integral formulas in Riemannian Geometry, Marcel Dekker, New York 1970
 with Shigeru Ishihara: Tangent and cotangent bundles: differential geometry, New York, M. Dekker 1973
 with Masahiro Kon: Anti-invariant submanifolds, Marcel Dekker, New York 1976
 Morio Obata (ed.): Selected papers of Kentaro Yano, North Holland 1982
 with Masahiro Kon: CR Submanifolds of Kählerian and Sasakian Manifolds, Birkhäuser 1983 2012 reprint
 with Masahiro Kon: Structures on Manifolds, World Scientific 1984

References

External links 
 

Differential geometers
20th-century Japanese mathematicians
1993 deaths
1912 births